The 34th Awit Awards were held on November 29, 2021. Indie pop duo Leanne & Naara and folk pop band Ben&Ben led the nominations with seven, and won the awards for Album of the Year and Record of the Year, respectively. The Song of the Year category was awarded to Moira Dela Torre and Jason Marvin's work of "Paubaya".

The ceremony had the theme "Proudly Homegrown", referring to pride and gratitude of the expression, inspiration, growth and strength shown by Original Philipino Music amid the COVID-19 pandemic. The ceremony also awarded thirty-three categories, including two debutants, Best New Artist in a Collaboration and Best Global Recording.

Performers

SB19
Fana
James Gulles
Rhythm & Drip
Alex Bruce
Unique Salonga
Extrapolation
Zack Tabudlo
Noel Cabangon
Leanne & Naara
Alamat
Lil Vinceyy
Sassa Dagdag
Eunice Jorge of Gracenote
Anthony Rosaldo
Jeremiah Tiangco
Bryan Chong
Jamm Rea
Zsaris
Selena Marie
BGYO
Janine Teñoso
Regine Velasquez-Alcasid
Ben&Ben

Winners and nominees
The nominations for the fan-voted categories, deemed as Peoples' Voice, were announced on October 28, 2021. While, the rest of the nominations were announced on November 6, 2021. Winners are listed first and highlighted in bold.

General field
Record of the Year
"Di Ka Sayang" – Ben&Ben
Poch Barretto, Toni Muñoz, Keifer Cabugao, Pat Lasaten, Paolo Benjamin and Jean Paul Verona, producers; Jean Paul Verona, recording engineer
"Dila" – Zild
Zild Benitez, producer; Zild Benitez, recording engineer
"Marupok" – KZ Tandingan
Roxy A. Liquigan and Jonathan Manalo, producers; Tim Recla, recording engineer
"Nangangamba" – Zack Tabudlo
Zack Tabudlo, producer; Zack Tabudlo, recording engineer
"Paubaya" – Moira Dela Torre
Roxy A. Liquigan, Jonathan Manalo, James Narvaez, Chris Ian Rosales and Luke Sigua, producers; Tim Recla and James Narvaez, recording engineers
"This Too Shall Pass" – Rico Blanco
Rico Blanco, producer; Rico Blanco, recording engineer
"Who's Gonna Love You" – Leanne & Naara
Brian Lotho and Kelley Mangahas, producers; Brian Lotho, recording engineer

Album of the Year
Daybreak – Leanne & NaaraWarner Music Philippines, executive producer; Brian Lotho, line producerDiwa – Juan Karlos
UMG Philippines and Juan Karlos Labajo, executive producers; Juan Karlos Labajo, Gian Franco, Rey Hipolito and Abe Hipolito, line producers
Homework Machine – Zild
Zild Benitez, executive producer; Zild Benitez, line producer
Pangalan – Unique Salonga
OC Records, executive producer; OC Records, line producer
Waiting for the End to Start – The Itchyworms
Sony Music Entertainment Philippines, executive producer; Jazz Nicolas and The Itchyworms, line producers

Song of the Year"Paubaya"Moira Dela Torre & Jason Marvin, songwriters (Moira Dela Torre)"Di Ka Sayang"
Paolo Benjamin & Miguel Benjamin, songwriters (Ben&Ben)
"Dila"
Daniel Zildjian Benitez, songwriter (Zild)
"Lifetime"
Paolo Benjamin & Miguel Benjamin, songwriters (Ben&Ben)
"Marupok"
Danielle Balagtas, songwriter (KZ Tandingan)
"Who's Gonna Love You"
Rose Caroline Mamonong & Naara Acueza, songwriters (Leanne & Naara)

Performance field
Best Performance by a Female Recording Artist"Right Next to You" – Keiko Necesario"Mahal Ko O Mahal Ako" – Regine Velasquez-Alcasid
"Paubaya" – Moira Dela Torre
"Agsardeng" – Miss Ramone
"Lunod" – Shaina Opsimar

Best Performance by a Male Recording Artist"Kulang ang Mundo" – Sam Mangubat"Puhon" – TJ Monterde
"Nangangamba" – Zack Tabudlo
"Pipiliin Pang Maghintay" – Noel Cabangon
"Tuloy Tuloy" – Quest

Best Collaboration Performance"Bestiny" – Jr Crown and Kevin Yadao"Kahit Kunwari Man Lang" – Moira Dela Torre and Agsunta
"Simula" – TJ Monterde and KZ Tandingan
"Sampaguita" – Juan Karlos and Gloc-9
"Bukas Walang Nang Ulan" – Christian Bautista and Janine Teñoso

Best Performance by a Group Recording Artist"Sariling Multo (Sa Panaginip)" – IV of Spades"Doors" – Ben&Ben
"Di Ka Sayang" – Ben&Ben
"Hanggang Sa Huli" – SB19
"Dumaloy" – Sud

Best Performance by a New Female Recording Artist"Out" – Fana"Liliwanag" – Trisha Denis
"1996" – Daze
"Somebody" – TJane Plaza
"Sana'y Tayo Pa" – TJane Plaza
"A.A" – Jenn Clemena

Best Performance by a New Male Recording Artist"Sayaw ng Mga Tala" – Matty Juniosa"Di Na Bale" – Bryant Dagdag
"Di Namalayan" – Benedict Cua
"Ulap" – Rob Deniel
"Hinungdan" – James Gulles

Best Performance by a New Group Recording Artist"Outlaws" – Nameless Kids"Pahina" – Kiss N Tell
"Pero" – Rhythm & Drip
"Love Kita Maniwala Ka" – JThree
"Suyo" – Reon

Best Child Recording Artist"The Kokak Song" – Bea CBest Instrumental Performance"Cosmic Cycles" – Four Corners MNL"Midnight Cruise" – Tristan Castro
"Dreaming of Tomorrow" – Abby Clutario
"Lovestruck" – Ken Tiongson
"Tama Na" – EJ De Perio

Best New Artist in a Collaboration"Magandang Dilag" – JM Bales featuring KVN"GG" – J-Nine with King Promdi
"Random Thoughts" – Vince Lucero and Mistah Lefty

Recording field
Best Global Recording"Rise" – Eric Bellinger, Iñigo Pascual, Sam Concepcion, Moophs, Zee Avi and Vince Nantes"Usahay" – Troy Laureta and Jake Zyrus
"Doors" – Ben&Ben
"Right Next to You" – Keiko Necesario
"Fix Me" – Travis Atreo featuring Amber Liu

Best Ballad Recording"Sa Susunod Na Habang Buhay" – Ben&Ben"Paubaya" – Moira Dela Torre
"Simula" – TJ Monterde & KZ Tandingan
"Araw't Gabi" – Clara Benin
"Pipiliin Pang Maghintay" – Noel Cabangon

Best Pop Recording"Happy Feelin'" – Rico Blanco"Gunita" – Kyryll
"Sumayaw (Sa Kanya-Kanyang Kwarto)" – Earl Generao
"Bago" – Autotelic
"Nangangamba" – Zack Tabudlo

Best Rock/Alternative Recording"Sariling Multo (Sa Panaginip)" – IV of Spades"Himala" – Silent Sanctuary
"Armageddon Blues" – The Itchyworms
"Paalam" – The Knobs
"Dumaloy" – Sud

Best World Music Recording"Palawan" – High Hello"Waiting for the End to Start" – The Itchyworms
"Never Made It Far" – Leanne & Naara
"Sana Naman" – JBK
"XX:XX" – Jason Dhakal & CRWN

Best Novelty Recording"Sabi Ko Nga Ba" – Hannah Precillas"Corona Ba Bye Na!" – Vice Ganda
"Bawal Lumabas (The Classroom Song)" – Kim Chiu
"DWYB" – Mimiyuuuh
"Tik Tok" – King Promdi

Best Traditional/Contemporary Folk Recording"Kita Na Kita" – Moira Dela Torre"Hulog Ni Bathala" – Sassa Dagdag
"Sa Susunod Na Habang Buhay" – Ben&Ben
"Bawat Araw" – Hans Dimayuga
"Choose You" – Leanne & Naara
"Evergreen" – Leanne & Naara

Best Dance Recording"G Na G" – Zsara Tiblani"Bad Influence" – Yuzon, Subzylla & Kyler
"Hibang" – La Santos
"Kinabukasan" – Deuges
"Love at First Sight" – Alexa Ilacad

Best Inspirational Recording"Di Ka Sayang" – Ben&Ben"Dakila Ka, Bayani Ka" – Polyeast Artists
"This Too Shall Pass" – Rico Blanco
"Tuloy Tuloy" – Quest

Best Christmas Recording"Paskong Walang Hanggan" – Arman Ferrer"Paano Ang Simbang Gabi (Kung Di Ikaw Ang Katabi)" – Drei Raña & Selena Marie
"Share the Love" – Elha Nympha
"A Brand New Christmas" – Martin Nievera
"'Tis the Season" – Katrina Velarde, Daryl Ong, Dea Formilleza and Yuki Ito

Best Rap/Hip-hop Recording"Umaga" – Arvey"Subtle Energy" – Juss Rye
"Yakap" – Alex Bruce
"88" – Zelijah & KNTMNL
"Sinayang" – Nobrvnd, Chelly

Best Jazz Recording"Poblacion" – Nicole Asensio"Villain" – Extrapolation
"'Wag" – Issa Rodriguez
"Lightning Strikes" – Basically Saturday Night
"Choose You" – Leanne & Naara

Best R&B Recording"Too Soon" – Leanne & Naara"Previously, On" – Conscious & The Goodness
"Elated" – August Wahh
"Gunita" – Kyryll
"Goodnight" – Jason Dhakal

Best Regional Recording"Ania Ko" – Route 83"Bulalakaw" – Janine Berdin & Joanna Ang
"Puhon" – TJ Monterde
"Tumang Kamingaw" – Tjane Plaza
"Suyo" – Reon
"Holly" – JKLRD & St. Ven

Best Song Written for Movie/TV/Stage Play"Hanggang Sa Huli" – Moira Dela Torre for 24/7
"Maligaya Ang Buhay" – Iñigo Pascual for Four Sisters Before the Wedding
"Malaya Ako" – Bryant for Hush
"Ang Sa Iyo Ay Akin" – Aegis for Ang sa Iyo ay Akin
"Ngayon" – Emerzon Texon featuring Dex Yu for Gameboys

Technical field
Best Engineered Recording
"Marupok"
Tim Recla, sound engineer; Purple Room Recording Studios, recording studio (KZ Tandingan)
"Puhon"
Albert Tamayo, sound engineer; ProdigiMusic Studio, recording studio (TJ Monterde)
"Sa Susunod Na Habang Buhay"
Jean Paul Verona, sound engineer; Verona Audio Design, recording studio (Ben&Ben)
"Nangangamba"
Zack Tabudlo, sound engineer (Zack Tabudlo)
"Dila"
Zild Benitez, sound engineer; Zild's Home Studio, recording studio (Zild)

Best Cover Art
Rico Blanco Songbook
Kurt Byron Vale Maligaya, graphic designer; Jason Paul Laxamana, concept (Rico Blanco)
Hibang
Joyce Ignacio, graphic designer; Emmie Villegas, concept (LA Santos)
Bago
Ivee Pendo, graphic designer; Autotelic, concept (Autotelic)
Purple Afternoon
Beatrix Zaragoza, graphic designer; Paolo Sandejas, concept (Paolo Sandejas)
Don't Look Back
Kyla Baltazar, graphic designer; Lorenzo Santos and Kyla Baltazar, concept (Lola Amour)

Best Music Video
"Dila"
Daniel Aguilar, director; Zild Benitez, producer (Zild)
"No Rush"
Jade Regala and Chapters, directors; Roxy A. Liquigan and Tarsier Records, producers (Kiana V featuring Billy Davis)
"Naubos Na"
Kyle Quismondo, director; Oh, Flamingo!, producers (Oh, Flamingo!)
"Hanggang Sa Huli"
Justin de Dios, director; ShowBT, producers (SB19)
"Poblacion"
Gorio Vicuna, director; Nicole Asensio, producer (Nicole Asensio)

Peoples' Voice
Peoples' Voice Favorite Male Artist
Anthony Rosaldo

Adie
Arvey
Because
Rico Blanco
Garrett Bolden
Ken Chan
Benedict Cua
JM de Guzman
EJ de Perio
Jason Dhakal
Darren Espanto
Fern
JMKO
Juan Karlos
Kritiko
Michael Dutchi Libranda
Jireh Lim
TJ Monterde
Arthur Nery
Nobrvnd
Miguel Odron
Dan Ombao
Quest
Unique Salonga
Zack Tabudlo
Zild

Peoples' Voice Favorite Female Artist
Elha Nympha

Barbie Almalbis
Anjl
Nicole Asensio
Marion Aunor
Clara Benin
Yeng Constantino
Moira Dela Torre
Shane G
Syd Hartha
Jona
Angela Ken
KZ
Dia Mate
Keiko Necesario
Angeline Quinto
Maris Racal
Sabrina
Janella Salvador
Sassa
Janine Tenoso
Esang de Torres
Bianca Umali
Zephanie
Zsaris

Peoples' Voice Favorite Breakthrough Artist
Shane G

8 Ballin
Adie
Arvey
Ace Banzuelo
Alex Bruce
Rob Deniel
JMKO
Angela Ken
Markus
Mimiyuuuh
Arthur Nery
Nobita
Miguel Odron
Dan Ombao
Raven
Zack Tabudlo
Lil Vinceyy
XOXO
Zephanie

Peoples' Voice Favorite Group Artist
BGYO

8 Ballin
ALMO$T
Bandang Lapis
Ben&Ben
Bini
BRWN
Cheats
The Company
The Itchyworms
JBK
The Juans
Kiss N Tell
Leanne & Naara
Lola Amour
One Click Straight
Over October
Rhythm & Drip
Sasaya
SB19
Shockra
Silent Sanctuary
Sponge Cola
St. Wolf
Sud
VVS Collective
XOXO

Peoples' Voice Favorite Song
"Hanggang sa Huli" – SB19

"Bago" – Autotelic
"Believe in Christmas" – Darren Espanto
"Blanko" – Janella Salvador
"Chinta Girl" – Lil Vinceyy featuring Guel
"Di Ka Sayang" – Ben&Ben
"Di Namalayan" – Benedict Cua
"Dumaloy" – Sud
"Hanggang Dito Na Lang" – TJ Monterde
"Higa" – Arthur Nery
"Huwag Ka Sanang Magagalit" – Unique Salonga
"Ikaw" – Autotelic
"Keeping Me Up" – Leanne & Naara
"Lambing" – Sasaya
"Let Go" – Leanne & Naara
"Lifetime" – Ben&Ben
"Marupok" – KZ Tandingan
"Nangangamba" – Zack Tabudlo
"Ngayong Gabi" – Nino Alejandro & Nicole Asensio
"Paalam" – Moira Dela Torre & Ben&Ben
"Pansamantala" – Lala Vinzon
"Patawad" – Moira Dela Torre
"Paubaya" – Moira Dela Torre
"Please Don't Leave" – Lola Amour
"Puhon" – TJ Monterde
"Ready, Let Go" – Keiko Necesario
"Right Next to You" – Keiko Necesario
"Sa Susunod Na Habang Buhay" – Ben&Ben
"Sinayang" – Nobrvnd & Chelly
"Sinungaling" – Zild
"S.S.H." – One Click Straight
"Stars" – Brwn
"Suyo" – Reon
"Tinadhana Sayo" – Zephanie
"Titulo" – Jeremiah
"Ulap" – Rob Deniel
"Who's Gonna Love You" – Leanne & Naara
"XOXO" – XOXO

Most Streamed Song
"Paubaya" – Moira Dela Torre

Most Streamed Artist
Ben&Ben

Dangal ng Musika Awardee
April Boy Regino

References

Awit Awards
2021 music awards
2021 in Philippine music